Mapleton is a city in Blue Earth County, Minnesota, United States. The population was 1,710 at the 2020 census. It is part of the Mankato-North Mankato Metropolitan Statistical Area.

History
Mapleton was platted at its current site in 1871 when the railroad was extended to that point.

Geography

Minnesota State Highways 22 and 30 are two of the main routes in the city.

Demographics

2010 census
As of the census of 2010, there were 1,756 people, 681 households, and 475 families living in the city. The racial makeup of the city was 97.4% White, 0.8% African American, 0.1% Native American, 0.5% Asian, 0.1% Pacific Islander, and 1.1% from two or more races. Hispanic or Latino of any race were 1.9% of the population.

There were 681 households, of which 37.0% had children under the age of 18 living with them, 52.0% were married couples living together, 11.6% had a female householder with no husband present, 6.2% had a male householder with no wife present, and 30.2% were non-families. 26.9% of all households were made up of individuals, and 14% had someone living alone who was 65 years of age or older. The average household size was 2.48 and the average family size was 2.99.

The median age in the city was 36.9 years. 27.4% of residents were under the age of 18; 6.4% were between the ages of 18 and 24; 25.8% were from 25 to 44; 23% were from 45 to 64; and 17.5% were 65 years of age or older. The gender makeup of the city was 48.4% male and 51.6% female.

2000 census
As of the census of 2000, there were 1,678 people, 637 households, and 443 families living in the city. The racial makeup of the city was 97.79% White, 0.48% Native American, 0.30% Asian, 0.06% Pacific Islander, 0.42% from other races, and 0.95% from two or more races. Hispanic or Latino of any race were 3.46% of the population.

There were 637 households, out of which 36.4% had children under the age of 18 living with them, 57.3% were married couples living together, 9.4% had a female householder with no husband present, and 30.3% were non-families. 26.1% of all households were made up of individuals, and 14.0% had someone living alone who was 65 years of age or older.  The average household size was 2.49 and the average family size was 3.01.

In the city, the population was spread out, with 26.5% under the age of 18, 8.4% from 18 to 24, 26.3% from 25 to 44, 18.4% from 45 to 64, and 20.3% who were 65 years of age or older.  The median age was 38 years. For every 100 females, there were 94.0 males.  For every 100 females age 18 and over, there were 85.1 males.

The median income for a household in the city was $38,790, and the median income for a family was $48,250. Males had a median income of $29,718 versus $20,656 for females. The per capita income for the city was $18,375.  About 2.9% of families and 3.7% of the population were below the poverty line, including 2.4% of those under age 18 and 7.9% of those age 65 or over.

Education
Maple River Senior High School is in the city.

Safety
Mapleton has three full-time police officers and four part-time officers providing 24-hour protection to the city. It has an all-volunteer fire department providing 24-hour protection for the city and the six surrounding townships.

References

External links
City website
Grown in Mapleton Local Community website
Maple River Messenger Newspaper

Cities in Blue Earth County, Minnesota
Cities in Minnesota
Mankato – North Mankato metropolitan area
1871 establishments in Minnesota